Olympia Apartments may refer to:

in Canada
 Olympia Apartments (Hamilton, Ontario)

in the United States
 Olympia Apartments (Washington, D.C.), listed on the NRHP in Washington, D.C.